Shannon Elizabeth Fadal (born September 7, 1973) is an American actress, conservationist, animal activist, model and poker player. A popular sex symbol and teen idol of the 1990s and 2000s, Elizabeth is best known for her roles in the films American Pie, Tomcats, Scary Movie, and Love Actually. She also starred in the films Jay and Silent Bob Strike Back, Thirteen Ghosts, Cursed, and Night of the Demons, and played a recurring role in the sitcom That '70s Show and was a series regular in Cuts.

Elizabeth splits her time between Cape Town, South Africa, and the USA, and runs her non-profit organization, an animal rescue turned conservation organization she co-created in 2001—previously Animal Avengers. The org is currently working alongside SANParks and Brett Barlow to care for Munu the Rhino and build him a sanctuary and breeding program. The Foundation has also launched One Woman's Legacy, a scholarship program that helps African women break through the glass ceiling in conservation studies.  She is a professional poker player, and in 2006 was named "one of the leading celebrity poker players."

Early life
Elizabeth was born in Houston, Texas, to a father of Lebanese ancestry, and to a mother of German, English and Irish ancestry. She was raised in Waco, Texas, from 3rd grade through high school; Elizabeth graduated from Waco High School in 1991. In high school, she was a member of the tennis team and at one point considered a professional tennis career. Elizabeth worked as a model for Ford & Elite models before she began a career in film.

Career

Elizabeth appeared in several films and television shows before being cast in 1999's American Pie in the role of Nadia. It was a major box office success. Elizabeth subsequently appeared in several Hollywood films, including Scary Movie, Jay and Silent Bob Strike Back, and Tomcats. Elizabeth starred in the UPN series Cuts until the show was canceled in May 2006. Elizabeth recurred in That '70s Show for a number of episodes.

In 2000 and 2003, she was featured in Maxim. In June 2008 she was Maxim'''s cover girl. She provided the likeness and voice for Serena St. Germaine in the 2004 video game James Bond 007: Everything or Nothing. Elizabeth was one of the celebrities on an episode of NBC's Thank God You're Here along with Tom Green, Chelsea Handler, and George Takei. Elizabeth was among the cast of the sixth season of Dancing with the Stars, partnered with Derek Hough. Elizabeth was the seventh star eliminated from the competition.In 2006, Elizabeth described poker as her second career and was called "one of the leading celebrity poker players." At that time, she visited the Las Vegas Valley up to three times each month to participate in poker games with top players. Elizabeth does not appear to have been as active a poker player since scoring 12 tournament cashes from 2006 through 2010 – she has only one tournament cash (in 2013) thereafter.

Elizabeth played in the Main Event of the 2005 World Series of Poker under the guidance of Daniel Negreanu, and won a special tournament celebrating the opening of a new poker room at Caesars Palace hotel in January 2006, beating out 83 celebrities and poker professionals to win $55,000. She also cashed four times in the World Series of Poker in 2006 and 2007, but again busted out of the Main Event early. In 2007, she advanced to the semi-finals of the NBC National Heads-Up Poker Championship in a field consisting of the top poker professionals before losing to eventual champion Paul Wasicka.

Elizabeth was the host of the comedy/burlesque series "Live Nude Comedy" in 2009. Elizabeth also featured in Chris Brown's "Next to You" music video as Brown's girlfriend in 2011. In 2019 she reprised her role as Justice in Jay and Silent Bob Reboot.''

Personal life

Elizabeth was married to actor Joseph D. Reitman from 2002 to 2005. She is an environmentalist and vegan. She is a cousin of New York-based television host and relationship coach Tamsen Fadal. Animal Avengers, a non-profit animal rescue organization founded by Elizabeth and her then-husband Reitman, is dedicated to rescuing and finding a home for homeless pets, reducing pet overpopulation, promoting responsible pet guardianship and preventing animal cruelty.

Among many fundraising events, Team Bodog raised over $50,000 for Animal Avengers in a celebrity poker night on October 8, 2005. The event was hosted by tournament director Matt Savage. In 2016, she began participating in numerous other Bodog-sponsored charity events as well. The organization, based in Brazil, lead 3D printing of prosthetic body parts for animals, including a beak for goose Victoria.

Elizabeth has served as the spokesperson for Farm Sanctuary's Adopt a Turkey program, urging people to adopt a turkey instead of eating one for Thanksgiving. She uses social media, particularly Instagram posts, to raise awareness about rhino poaching at the Poached Rhino fundraiser. She is currently married to Simon Borchert as of 2022.

Filmography

Film

Television

Video games

Dancing with the Stars

Awards and nominations

References

External links

 

1973 births
Living people
20th-century American actresses
21st-century American actresses
Actresses from Houston
Actresses from Waco, Texas
American expatriates in South Africa
American film actresses
American people of Arab descent
American people of Lebanese descent
American people of English descent
American people of German descent
American people of Irish descent
American poker players
American television actresses
Female poker players
Participants in American reality television series
Waco High School alumni